František Trkal (born 10 April 1970) is a Czech former cyclist. He competed in two events at the 1992 Summer Olympics.

Major results

1988
1st  Overall Course de la Paix Juniors
1989
1st Stage 5 Bayern Rundfahrt
1991
10th Overall Peace Race
1993
2nd Overall Peace Race
1st Stages 3 & 5
1994
2nd Overall Tour du Vaucluse
3rd Overall Peace Race
1st Stage 1
1995
1st  Overall Okolo Slovenska
5th Overall Peace Race
1996
1st Stage 6 Peace Race
1st Stage 2 International Tour of Rhodes
5th HEW Cyclassics
1999
3rd Road race, National Road Championships
2000
4th Overall International Tour of Rhodes
1st Prologue & Stages 2 & 4
2001
1st  Overall Okolo Slovenska
1st Stage 2
2002
4th Overall Okolo Slovenska
2004
8th Poreč Trophy

References

External links
 

1970 births
Living people
Czech male cyclists
Olympic cyclists of Czechoslovakia
Cyclists at the 1992 Summer Olympics
People from Litomyšl
Sportspeople from the Pardubice Region